KIBH-FM (91.7 FM, "Seward Public Radio") is a radio station licensed to serve the community of Seward, Alaska. The station is owned by Kenai Mountains Public Media, Inc., and airs a community radio format.

The station was assigned the KIBH-FM call letters by the Federal Communications Commission on August 25, 2009.

References

External links
 Official Website
 FCC Public Inspection File for KIBH-FM
 

IBH-FM
Radio stations established in 2011
2011 establishments in Alaska
Community radio stations in the United States
Kenai Peninsula Borough, Alaska